Patineur Grotesque was a film of a comic roller-skater.

Marius Sestier filmed the comic act in Prince Alfred Park in the South Sydney-Redfern area in 1896. The film was not released until 1897 in Lyon, France. The film was listed in the original Lumière Brothers catalogue as Lumière N°117 and N°73 in a newer catalogue.

Sestier together with Henry Walter Barnett had made approximately 19 films in Sydney and Melbourne between October and November 1896, these being the very first films recorded in Australia.

References

External links

1890s Australian films
1897 comedy films
Films set in 1896
Australian comedy short films
Australian silent short films
Australian black-and-white films
1897 short films
Silent comedy films